is a Japanese professional golfer.

Kaneko played on the Japan Golf Tour, winning six times.

Professional wins (7)

Japan Golf Tour wins (6)

1Co-sanctioned by the Asia Golf Circuit

Japan Golf Tour playoff record (0–1)

Japan Challenge Tour wins (1)
1988 Kanto Kokusai Open

Team appearances
Dunhill Cup (representing Japan): 1990
Four Tours World Championship (representing Japan): 1991

References

External links

Japanese male golfers
Japan Golf Tour golfers
Sportspeople from Tokyo
1961 births
Living people